Immingham Dock railway station served the dock at Immingham, Lincolnshire, England.

History

Immingham Dock was opened on 17 November 1913 by the Great Central Railway at a point where the deep water channel came close to the Lincolnshire bank of the River Humber.

In order to get their workers from Kingston upon Hull,  and surrounding villages to the dock the company built the Barton and Immingham Light Railway, which terminated at the temporary Immingham Western Jetty railway station near to the curving embankment which carried trains up to the Western Jetty itself.

The temporary station lasted for some years. The July 1922 Bradshaw's Guide shows Immingham Western jetty as the line's terminus, whilst a photograph of a locomotive in Great Central livery using the permanent replacement Immingham Dock station suggests the handover took place around 1922. The new station was nearer the dock gates.

Dock workers from the Grimsby direction were catered for by the Grimsby and Immingham Electric Railway, an inter-urban tram system which also terminated at a station named Immingham Dock. Trains and trams at the two stations faced each other from opposite sides of the dock's entrance lock gates

The station had a single curving platform with a run round facility and a small pagoda - style station building which housed the usual facilities. The platform was constructed in wood, later rebuilt with concrete supports.

The station escaped closure when passenger services were withdrawn from the branch on 17 June 1963 because a service which had been provided since at least 1954 via  was upgraded from unadvertised workmen's trains to publicly timetabled passenger trains. This service was withdrawn on 6 October 1969 when the station finally closed.

On 7 October 1967 a RCTS railtour visited the station.

By 2015 no trace of the station remained.

References

Sources

External links

Disused railway stations in the Borough of North East Lincolnshire
Former Great Central Railway stations
Railway stations in Great Britain opened in 1913
Railway stations in Great Britain closed in 1969
Immingham